The following radio stations broadcast on FM frequency 92.7 MHz:

Argentina
 Always in General Alvear, Mendoza
 AZ in Rosario, Santa Fe
 Estación FM in Villa del Totoral, Córdoba
 La 2x4 in Buenos Aires
 La 750 in Salta
 La Correntada in San Pedro, Buenos Aires
 Lider in Mar del Plata, Buenos Aires
 Los Zorros in ¿Villa María?, Córdoba
 Más in San Salvador de Jujuy, Jujuy
 Radio María in Pigüe, Buenos Aires
 Radio María in Huinca Renancó, Córdoba
 Radio María in Villa Carlos Paz, Córdoba
 Radio María in Concepción, Tucumán
 Radio María in Rosario de la Frontera, Salta
 Radio María in San Antonio de los Cobres, Salta
 Radio María in San Justo, Santa Fe
 San Benito in San Benito, Entre Ríos
 Stylo in Villa Dolores, Buenos Aires
 Unión in Santa Rita Alba Posse, Misiones

Australia
 2KY in Port Macquarie, New South Wales
 Zoo FM in Dubbo, New South Wales
 4SSS in Sunshine Coast, Queensland
 ABC Southern Queensland in Goondiwindi, Queensland
 5FBI in Adelaide, South Australia
 ABC Classic FM in Bendigo, Victoria
3CCS in Lorne, Victoria

Canada (Channel 224)
 CBF-FM-12 in Victoriaville, Quebec
 CBTW-FM in Woss Camp, British Columbia
 CBUL-FM in Lillooet, British Columbia
 CBWS-FM in Brandon, Manitoba
 CBW-FM in Jackhead, Manitoba
 CBXZ-FM-1 in Ucluelet, British Columbia
 CBYX-FM in Enderby, British Columbia
 CFBZ-FM in Fernie, British Columbia
 CFFF-FM in Peterborough, Ontario
 CFIM-FM in Cap-aux-Meules, Quebec
 CHAR-FM in Rankin Inlet, Nunavut
 CHBD-FM in Regina, Saskatchewan
 CHSL-FM in Slave Lake, Alberta
 CIAM-FM in Fort Vermilion, Alberta
 CIFM-FM-2 in Clearwater, British Columbia
 Native Communications, CITP-FM in The Pas, Manitoba
 CJBM-FM in Gaspe, Quebec
 CJBM-FM-1 in Riviere-au-Renard, Quebec
 CJBX-FM in London, Ontario
 CJDC (AM) in Tumbler Ridge, British Columbia
 CJEM-FM in Edmundston, New Brunswick
 CJMC-FM in Ste-Marthe, Quebec
 CJMC-FM in Mont-Louis, Quebec
 CJMC-FM in Grande Vallee, Quebec
 CJMC-FM in Gros Morne, Quebec
 CJPV-FM in Pincher Creek, Alberta
 CJRQ-FM in Sudbury, Ontario
 CJSP-FM in Leamington, Ontario
 CJSQ-FM in Quebec City, Quebec
 CJVN-FM in Ottawa, Ontario 
 CKBR-FM in Dillon, Saskatchewan
 CKDR-FM in Dryden, Ontario
 VF2044 in Parson, British Columbia
 VF2287 in Hagensborg, British Columbia
 VF2389 in Big Island Lake, Saskatchewan
 VF2533 in Inuvik, Nunavut
 VF2558 in Pemberton, British Columbia
 VF8003 in La Guadeloupe, Quebec
 VF8008 in Weedon, Quebec

China
 Beijing Sports Radio and Beijing Youth Radio in Beijing (cabel FM)
 Long Guang Xinwen Wang in Heilongjiang

India
BIG FM 92.7 in New Delhi
 See other 92.7 stations in India at same page.

Japan
 JOGO in Hachinohe, Aomori
 JODR in Niigata
 JOIF in Yukuhashi, Fukuoka

Malaysia
 Nasional FM in Miri, Sarawak
 Sabah V FM in Kota Kinabalu, Sabah

Mexico
 XHAGP-FM in Agua Prieta, Sonora
 XHCPDD-FM in Huejutla de Reyes, Hidalgo
 XHEAAA-FM in Guadalajara, Jalisco
 XHELPZ-FM in La Paz, Baja California Sur
 XHLC-FM in La Piedad, Michoacán
 XHPCHO-FM in Guachochi, Chihuahua
 XHPECB-FM in Villa Comaltitlán, Chiapas
 XHPHGO-FM in Ciudad Hidalgo, Michoacán
 XHPQUI-FM in Quiroga, Michoacán
 XHPRGZ-FM in Río Grande, Zacatecas
 XHPVTP-FM in Villa de Tamazulápam del Progreso, Oaxaca
 XHRTA-FM in Aguascalientes, Aguascalientes
 XHSAV-FM in San Andrés Tuxtla, Veracruz
 XHTGT-FM in Tuxtla Gutiérrez, Chiapas
 XHUM-FM in Valladolid, Yucatán
 XHVAY-FM in Puerto Vallarta, Jalisco
 XHVJP-FM in Xicotepec de Juárez, Puebla
 XHXE-FM in Querétaro, Querétaro

Philippines 
DXBC-FM in General Santos
DWRA in Baguio
DWCL in San Fernando, Pampanga
DWKL in Lucena
DYII in Tagbilaran

South Africa
 Radio 702 in Johannesburg

Turkey
TRT-2 in Kozan

United States (Channel 224)
 KALP in Alpine, Texas
  in Leesville, Louisiana
  in Blanding, Utah
 KBEU in Bearden, Arkansas
 KBMW-FM in Breckenridge, Minnesota
  in Chico, California
  in Las Vegas, New Mexico
  in Ainsworth, Nebraska
 KBYO-FM in Farmerville, Louisiana
 KCON in Vilonia, Arkansas
 KCXU-LP in San Jose, California
 KDSK-FM in Grants, New Mexico
  in Ely, Nevada
 KDYN-FM in Coal Hill, Arkansas
  in South Padre Island, Texas
 KFTN-LP in Fenton, Missouri
  in Gold Beach, Oregon
  in Pierre, South Dakota
 KHBC (FM) in Hilo, Hawaii
 KHKY in Akiachak, Alaska
 KHRW in Ranchester, Wyoming
 KHWI in Hilo, Hawaii
 KHWR-LP in McAlester, Oklahoma
 KINL in Eagle Pass, Texas
  in Rawlins, Wyoming
 KISY in Blossom, Texas
 KIVY-FM in Crockett, Texas
 KJBZ in Laredo, Texas
 KJFP-LP in Hot Springs, South Dakota
  in Mansfield, Louisiana
 KKBA in Kingsville, Texas
  in Guymon, Oklahoma
  in Glenwood Springs, Colorado
 KKNB-LP in Kanab, Utah
  in Indio, California
  in Algona, Iowa
  in Eldon, Missouri
 KMEA-LP in Bozeman, Montana
 KMOY in Dededo, Guam
 KMSW in The Dalles, Oregon
 KNCU in Newport, Oregon
 KNCW in Omak, Washington
 KOCF-LP in Veneta, Oregon
  in Grangeville, Idaho
 KOUR-LP in Coralville, Iowa
 KPKX-LP in Globe, Arizona
 KQAY-FM in Tucumcari, New Mexico
 KQHE in Fairbanks, Alaska
 KREV (FM) in Alameda, California
 KRNR in Goldthwaite, Texas
 KRRN in Moapa Valley, Nevada
 KRSY-FM in La Luz, New Mexico
  in Sunriver, Oregon
 KRZP in Gassville, Arkansas
 KSBU in Delta, Louisiana
  in Savannah, Missouri
  in Salmon, Idaho
  in Marina, California
 KTRX in Dickson, Oklahoma
  in Ottumwa, Iowa
 KUNK in Mendocino, California
 KUSO in Albion, Nebraska
 KUTM in Kerman, California
 KVCE in Slaton, Texas
  in Wolf Point, Montana
 KVRL-LP in Longview, Texas
 KWME in Wellington, Kansas
  in Winnemucca, Nevada
 KYCT in Shasta Lake, California
 KYLA in Fountain Valley, California
 KYRA in Thousand Oaks, California
 KYSW-LP in Slidell, Louisiana
 KYZA in Adelanto, California
 KZHC-FM in Burns, Oregon
  in Ridgecrest, California
 KZJM-LP in Lafayette, Louisiana
 KZSQ-FM in Sonora, California
  in Minneapolis, Kansas
  in Arab, Alabama
 WASU-LP in Albany, Georgia
  in Stuart, Florida
 WBHQ in Beverly Beach, Florida
 WBKL in Clinton, Louisiana
 WBNK in Pine Knoll Shores, North Carolina
 WBPL-LP in Wilmington, North Carolina
  in Tisbury, Massachusetts
 WCCR-FM in Clarion, Pennsylvania
 WCFW in Kewaunee, Wisconsin
 WCMI-FM in Catlettsburg, Kentucky
 WCPY in Arlington Heights, Illinois
 WCRS-LP in Columbus, Ohio
 WCVL-FM in Charlottesville, Virginia
 WDCJ in Prince Frederick, Maryland
 WDMZ-LP in Benton, Kentucky
  in Waupaca, Wisconsin
  in Flint, Michigan
 WEFC-LP in Galloway, Ohio
 WEMR-LP in Chambersburg, Pennsylvania
 WENI-FM in South Waverly, Pennsylvania
  in Key West, Florida
 WFHG-FM in Bluff City, Tennessee
 WFHS-LP in Fern Creek, Kentucky
 WFME-FM in Garden City, New York
  in Brazil, Indiana
  in Harrisburg, North Carolina
 WFPF-LP in Frostproof, Florida
  in Glens Falls, New York
  in Clarksburg, West Virginia
  in Rehoboth Beach, Delaware
 WGTC-LP in Mayhew, Mississippi
  in South Zanesville, Ohio
  in Russell Springs, Kentucky
 WICU-FM in Lawrence Park, Pennsylvania
  in Harriman, Tennessee
  in Martinsburg, Pennsylvania
  in Dublin, Georgia
 WKLD-LP in Bainbridge, Georgia
  in Mullens, West Virginia
 WKRA-FM in Holly Springs, Mississippi
  in Brattleboro, Vermont
 WKXG in Moorhead, Mississippi
  in Eufaula, Alabama
 WLFW in Johnston, South Carolina
 WLSL-LP in Saint Leo, Florida
  in Galesburg, Illinois
 WMAY-FM in Taylorville, Illinois
  in Middlesboro, Kentucky
 WMXR-LP in Miami, Florida
  in Toms River, New Jersey
 WOOG-LP in Troy, New York
 WOXO-FM in Norway, Maine
 WPKG in Neillsville, Wisconsin
 WPPY in Starview, Pennsylvania
  in Calais, Maine
  in Bucyrus, Ohio
 WQTK in Ogdensburg, New York
 WRAQ-LP in Angelica, New York
 WROP-LP in Columbia, South Carolina
 WRPP in Manistique, Michigan
  in Middletown, New York
 WRXW-LP in Winter Park, Florida
 WSJF-LP in Eldersburg, Maryland
 WSSI in St. Simons Island, Georgia
 WSWE-LP in Sweet Briar, Virginia
 WTDR-FM in Talladega, Alabama
 WURB-LP in Kissimmee, Florida
 WVLI in Kankakee, Illinois
 WVTO-LP in Baltimore, Maryland
 WVZA in Herrin, Illinois
 WWWH-FM in Haleyville, Alabama
 WXFC-LP in Blue Ridge, Georgia
 WXGN-LP in Ocean City, New Jersey
 WXKU-FM in Austin, Indiana
  in Herkimer, New York
  in Saugatuck, Michigan
  in Berne, Indiana
 WZBY in Grand Portage, Minnesota
 WZOP-LP in Fort Lauderdale, Florida

References

Lists of radio stations by frequency